Earl Pritchard may refer to:
 Earl A. Pritchard (1884–?), American football, basketball and baseball coach
 Earl H. Pritchard (1907–1995), scholar of China